Richard Newton may refer to:

 Richard Newton (caricaturist) (1777–1798), English caricaturist
 A. Richard Newton (1951–2007), electrical engineer
 Richard Newton (academic) (1676–1753), English academic, Principal of Hertford College, Oxford
 Richard Newton (actor), American film and television actor, see Matlock

 Richard Newton (justice) (died 1448), English justice
 Richard Orr Newton (1905–1963), politician in British Columbia, Canada
 Richard Blake Newton (1801–1868), English landowner
 Richard Bullen Newton (1854–1926), British paleontologist
 R. Heber Newton (1840–1914), American Episcopalian priest and writer
 Richard Newton, justice on the Supreme court of Victoria, see John David Phillips
 Richard Legh, 5th Baron Newton, a Baron in the peerage of the United Kingdom